The Ward County Courthouse in Minot, North Dakota was built in 1929.  Along with two other "distinctive county buildings in North Dakota", the Barnes County Courthouse and the Burke County Courthouse, it was designed by the Minneapolis, Minnesota, firm Toltz, King, and Day.

Costing $498,000, it was the most expensive county courthouse built in the state for almost 30 years.

It was listed on the National Register of Historic Places in 1985.

References

Art Deco architecture in North Dakota
Government buildings completed in 1929
Buildings and structures in Minot, North Dakota
Courthouses on the National Register of Historic Places in North Dakota
County courthouses in North Dakota
National Register of Historic Places in Ward County, North Dakota
1929 establishments in North Dakota